David Alan Wenlock (born 16 April 1959) is a former English cricketer. Wenlock was a right-handed batsman who bowled right-arm medium pace. He was born in Leicester, Leicestershire.

Wenlock made his first-class debut for Leicestershire against Oxford University in 1980. He 9 further first-class appearances for Leicestershire, the last of which came against Northamptonshire in the 1992 County Championship. He scored 148 runs in his 10 first-class matches, at an average of 16.44, with a high score of 62. This score, his only first-class half century, came against the touring Sri Lankans in 1981. With the ball, he took 7 wickets at bowling average of 38.28, with best figures of 3/50. He made his List A debut for Leicestershire in the 1980 John Player League against Sussex. He made 31 further List A appearances for Leicestershire, the last of which came against Northamptonshire in the 1982 John Player League. In his 33 limited-overs appearances for the county, he scored 126 runs at an average of 10.50, with a high score of 22. With the ball, he took 32 wickets at an average of 24.96, with best figures of 3/32.

He later joined Staffordshire, making his debut for the county against Hertfordshire in the 1985 Minor Counties Championship. He played Minor counties cricket for Staffordshire in 1985 and 1986, making 2 appearances each in the Minor Counties Championship and MCCA Knockout Trophy. He made his only List A appearance for Staffordshire against Nottinghamshire in the 1985 NatWest Trophy. In this match, he was dismissed for a duck by Kevin Saxelby, while with the ball he bowled 12 wicket-less overs for the cost of 45 runs.

References

External links
David Wenlock at ESPNcricinfo
David Wenlock at CricketArchive

1959 births
Living people
Cricketers from Leicester
English cricketers
Leicestershire cricketers
Staffordshire cricketers